Cucunatí  is a corregimiento in Chepigana District, Darién Province, Panama with a population of 1,346 as of 2010. It was created by Law 58 of July 29, 1998, owing to the Declaration of Unconstitutionality of Law 1 of 1982. Its population as of 2000 was 1,105.

References

Corregimientos of Darién Province